Jan Anne Jonkman (Utrecht, 13 September 1891 – The Hague, 27 June 1976) was a Dutch politician.

He was a member of the PvdA. As a minister, he dealt with colonial affairs. He was also president of the Senate from 1951 to 1966. He was preceded by Roelof Kranenburg and was succeeded by his party colleague Jannes Pieter Mazure.

Decorations
: Knight Grand Cross of the Order of the Netherlands Lion 
: Commander of the Order of Orange-Nassau

References

1891 births
1976 deaths
Ministers of Colonial Affairs of the Netherlands
Presidents of the Senate (Netherlands)
Members of the Senate (Netherlands)
Politicians from Utrecht (city)